Berthe Weill (Paris 1865 – 1951) was a French art dealer who played a vital role in the creation of the market for twentieth-century art with the manifestation of the Parisian Avant-Garde. Although she is much less known than her well-established competitors like Ambroise Vollard, Daniel-Henry Kahnweiler and Paul Rosenberg, she may be credited with producing the first sales in Paris for Pablo Picasso and Henri Matisse and with providing Amedeo Modigliani with the only solo exhibition in his lifetime (see poster advertising the exhibition).

The impressive list of artists who made their way through her gallery and into the canon of modern art continues with names such as Raoul Dufy, André Derain, Maurice de Vlaminck, Diego Rivera, Georges Braque, Kees van Dongen, Maurice Utrillo, Pablo Picasso and Jean Metzinger. Her role was also important in the early exposure and sales of women painters such as Suzanne Valadon, Emilie Charmy and Jacqueline Marval.

In 1933, Weill published her memoirs, an account of thirty years as an art dealer, from which many historical renditions quote. Her gallery lasted until 1939, and notwithstanding the number of luminary artists that passed through her gallery, she remained poor and destitute her whole life and after her death was almost forgotten.
 
Recently, interest in Berthe Weill has become more significant. In 2007, Picasso's portrait of Berthe Weill (1920) was designated a French national treasure. In 2009, her memoirs (1933) were republished and a compilation of her gallery exhibitions; in 2011, the first study dedicated to her life and dealership was published by leading Weill scholar Marianne Le Morvan. In February 2012, the City of Paris decided to place a memorial plaque at 25 rue Victor Massé (Paris), where Berthe Weill opened her first gallery in 1900.

Life and career

Esther Berthe Weill was born in Paris into an Alsatian Jewish lower middle class family, one of seven children. As her parents were of modest means, Weill was placed as an apprentice in Mayer's antique shop where she learned the business of the trade and acquired considerable knowledge, in particular, of eighteenth century engravings. This experience would serve her well as she also met collectors, writers and other dealers.

Upon Mayer's death, she opened a little shop in association with one of her brothers, but it did not last long (1897-1900).  Under the influence of Roger Marx, a renowned art critic, she became interested in the art of the new young painters. She bought, exhibited, and sold work by Picasso before the artist moved to Paris, becoming his first dealer in 1900.

On December 1, 1901, Weill used part of her dowry to open "Galerie B. Weill" at 25 rue Victor Massé, calling it a place for the young. There she bought and sold modernist works of art, largely Fauvist and Cubist.  She did not amass a large collection, nor focus in on a particular style or set of artists, causing many artists to switch to more financially stable dealers as their careers progressed. In 1908 and 1909, she exhibited works by Fauves including Braque, Derain, Manguin, Marquet, Marval and Matisse. In 1913, she curated a show with works by Gleizes, Léger and Metzinger. She hosted a group exhibition with works by and Gleizes, Léger, and Picasso.

Galerie Berthe Weill changed locations in 1917, from 25 rue Victor-Massé to 50 rue Taitbout, then again in 1919 to 46 rue Laffitte, in the former gallery of Clovis Sagot. At the same time, Weill inaugurated her "librairie artistique" and launched her publication titled  Bulletin.

In 1941, rising antisemitism and the outbreak of World War II forced her to close her gallery.

In 1946, many painters who she had championed over the years came together and held an auction of their donated art work, the proceeds went to support the dealer, so she could live in some comfort for the last years of her life.

In 1948, the Republic of France recognized her as a Chevalier de Légion d'Honneur, for her contribution to Modern Art.

In 1951, Weill died at the age of 86. Although she was recognized at some level during her lifetime, she was left with a legacy of being either misunderstood or relegated to the footnotes of historical accounts of the period, until recent renewed interest emerged.

Artists
Picasso, Matisse, Jeanne (Jane) Rosoy, Derain, Vlaminck, Marquet, Manguin, Camoin, Raoul Dufy, Diego Rivera, Braque, Friesz, van Dongen, Utrillo, Puy, Metzinger, Odette Des Garets, Modigliani, Rouault, Marie Laurencin, Suzanne Valadon, Emilie Charmy, Kisling, Flandrin, Léger, Pascin, Georges Kars.

Collectors

 Adolphe Brisson, Literary Critic for Temps
Picasso's first sales in Paris were three pastels on canvas depicting bullfighting scenes, which Weill sold to him in 1900.
 Arthur Huc, Director of La Dépêche de Toulouse. Weill sold Le Moulin de la Galette (1900) to Arthur Huc.  According to John Richardson, Huc was "one of the most progressive collectors of the day". Later this painting was bought by Justin Thannhauser who donated it to the Guggenheim Museum (NY).
 Franz Jourdain, Architect of the Samaritaine Department Store, first president of the Salon d'Automne ; in 1902, Weill sold a Marquet to him.
 André Level, Head of the consortium of investors who, in 1904, began forming the Peau de l'Ours art collection of twentieth-century art. In 1914, it was sold at auction and was notable for its "phenomenal financial success". "Weill claimed that three-quarters of the items in the collection were purchased from her gallery.  Even if she exaggerated, there is no doubt that Level bought from her on a regular basis.
 Gertrude and Leo Stein, American expatriates living in Paris who played a pivotal role in promoting and collecting avant-garde art
 Olivier Saincère, Counsellor of State and future secretary general of the Élysée under Raymond Poincaré, one of Weill's first collectors.
 Gustave Coquiot, French writer and art critic, collector of Maurice Utrillo.
 Sergei Shchukin, Russian collector from Moscow.

References

External links 

 ''Berthe Weill Archives"
 Berthe Weill: Galériste à Montmartre. Biography by Françoise Job, 2005
 Decision by the Council of Paris to install a "plaque commémorative" at 25, rue Victor Massé 

French art dealers
Women art dealers
Defunct art museums and galleries in Paris
Alsatian Jews
1865 births
1951 deaths